The Cold Lake oil sands are a large deposit of oil sands located near Cold Lake, Alberta. Cold Lake is east of Alberta's capital, Edmonton, near Alberta's border with Saskatchewan, and a small portion of the Cold Lake field lies in Saskatchewan.

In 1980, a plant in Cold Lake was one of just two oil sands plants under construction in Alberta.Although not developed as quickly and extensively as originally envisioned, an Imperial Oil plant in Cold Lake became the largest in situ oil sands project constructed in Alberta during the 1980s. By 1991, its daily oil production was 90,000 barrels.

Some of the oil sands in the Cold Lake deposit have a low enough density that they can be extracted through drilling, as opposed to mining.

See also
 Athabasca oil sands
 Peace River oil sands
 Melville Island oil sands
 Wabasco oil sands
 List of articles about Canadian tar sands

References

Bituminous sands of Canada